Nancy Carrasco is a Professor in, and the Chair of, the Department of Molecular Physiology and Biophysics at Vanderbilt University. Carrasco has conducted research in the fields of biochemistry, biophysics, molecular physiology, molecular endocrinology, and cancer. She cloned the sodium/iodide symporter (NIS), a breakthrough  in  thyroid pathophysiology with ramifications for many other fields, including structure/function of transport proteins, molecular endocrinology, gene transfer studies, cancer, and public health (she has served on the Environmental Protection Agency's Science Advisory Board).

Early life and education
Carrasco was born in Mexico City, Mexico. She obtained her M.D. from the School of Medicine and her M.S. in Biochemistry from the School of Chemistry at the National Autonomous University of Mexico in 1980 and 1981, respectively. She subsequently became a postdoctoral fellow at the Roche Institute of Molecular Biology in New Jersey, for which she received a Fogarty International Fellowship from the National Institutes of Health. She did her postdoctoral training in the laboratory of Ronald Kaback. In the course of her postdoctoral work, Carrasco—among other things—generated monoclonal and site-directed polyclonal antibodies against the lactose permease of E. coli. She used these antibodies to determine the topology of the lactose permease in the membrane of E. coli, and identified the proton translocation pathway that provides the driving force for lactose accumulation by E. coli.

Career 
In 1987, Carrasco joined the faculty of the Albert Einstein College of Medicine, and in 2011 she moved to the Yale School of Medicine. At Yale, in 2018, Carrasco became the C.N.H. Long Professor of Physiology.

In the summer of 2019, Carrasco moved again, this time to Vanderbilt University, where she became the Chair of the Department of Molecular Physiology and Biophysics.

She is a member of the Editorial Board for PNAS.

Sodium/Iodide Symporter 
Carrasco's research group was the first to clone, and extensively characterize at the molecular level, the sodium/iodide symporter (NIS), the key plasma membrane protein that mediates the active transport of iodide into the thyroid, the lactating breast, and other tissues. Carrasco's group has obtained a great deal of mechanistic information on NIS by determining the molecular requirements of this protein at amino acid positions at which mutations have been found in patients. Her group also discovered that, although NIS transports iodide but not chloride (unlike chloride transporters and channels, which transport both), NIS also transports other anions, including the environmental pollutant perchlorate. In addition, her group recently identified an allosteric site in NIS—which, when occupied by an oxyanion such as perchlorate, completely changes the mechanism by which NIS transports iodide. This finding indicates that perchlorate pollution may well be more dangerous to human health than previously thought.

The Carrasco group's NIS knockout mouse has made it possible to generate an animal model of hypothyroidism without the need to use any drugs (e.g., methimazole or propylthiouracil). This animal model has proven to be an extremely valuable tool for investigating the cross-talk between different tissues regulated by the thyroid hormones.

Personal life
Nancy Carrasco is married to Samuel Zyman, a composer with a degree in medicine from the National Autonomous University of Mexico and a doctorate in music composition from the Juilliard School who is now a faculty member at the Juilliard School and at the Blair School of Music at Vanderbilt University. Carrasco and Zyman met on their first day of medical school. They have a son, Erik Zyman, a theoretical syntactician who is a faculty member at the University of Chicago.

Awards
Pew Award (1989)
Beckman Young Investigators Award, Beckman Foundation (1991)
Maria Sibylla Merian Award (1998)
Marshall S. Horwitz Faculty Prize for Research Excellence (2009)
Light of Life Award, Light of Life Foundation (2010)
Member of the National Academy of Sciences (2015)
Sidney H. Ingbar Distinguished Lecturer, American Thyroid Association (2016)
Member of the National Academy of Medicine (2020)

The Pew Award is given based on biomedical research. The Beckman Young Investigators Award is given to young members in the early stages of their careers in chemical and life sciences, providing them with research support. Carrasco was the first person to be awarded the Maria Sibylla Merian Award, given by the Essen College of Gender Studies in 1998. The Light of Life Award is given by the Light of Life Foundation to research that has impacted the understanding of Thyroid cancers. The Sidney H. Ingbar Distinguished Lecturer award is given to individuals who have provided major contributions to the research on thyroid.

Additionally, she serves on the editorial board of The Journal of General Physiology, and has served as the President of the Society of Latin American Biophysicists.

Published Works 

Martín M, Modenutti CP, Peyret V, Geysels RC, Darrouzet E, Pourcher T, Masini-Repiso AM, Martí MA, Carrasco N, Nicola JP. (2019) A Carboxy-Terminal Monoleucine-Based Motif Participates in the Basolateral Targeting of the Na+/I- Symporter. Endocrinology. 160: 156–168. PMID 30496374 DOI: 10.1210/en.2018-00603

Ferrandino G, Kaspari RR, Spadaro O, Reyna-Neyra A, Perry RJ, Cardone R, Kibbey RG, Shulman GI, Dixit VD, Carrasco N. (2017) Pathogenesis of hypothyroidism-induced NAFLD is driven by intra- and extrahepatic mechanisms. Proceedings of the National Academy of Sciences of the United States of America. 114: E9172-E9180. PMID 29073114 DOI: 10.1073/pnas.1707797114

Ferrandino G, Kaspari RR, Reyna-Neyra A, Boutagy NE, Sinusas AJ, Carrasco N. (2017) An extremely high dietary iodide supply forestalls severe hypothyroidism in Na(+)/I(-) symporter (NIS) knockout mice. Scientific Reports. 7: 5329. PMID 28706256 DOI: 10.1038/s41598-017-04326-z

Ravera S, Reyna-Neyra A, Ferrandino G, Amzel LM, Carrasco N. (2017) The Sodium/Iodide Symporter (NIS): Molecular Physiology and Preclinical and Clinical Applications. Annual Review of Physiology. 79: 261–289. PMID 28192058 DOI: 10.1146/annurev-physiol-022516-034125

Ferrandino G, Nicola JP, Sánchez YE, Echeverria I, Liu Y, Amzel LM, Carrasco N. (2016) Na+ coordination at the Na2 site of the Na+/I- symporter. Proceedings of the National Academy of Sciences of the United States of America. PMID 27562170 DOI: 10.1073/pnas.1607231113

Renier C, Do J, Reyna-Neyra A, Foster D, De A, Vogel H, Jeffrey SS, Tse V, Carrasco N, Wapnir I. (2016) Regression of experimental NIS-expressing breast cancer brain metastases in response to radioiodide/gemcitabine dual therapy. Oncotarget. PMID 27363025 DOI: 10.18632/oncotarget.10238

Ravera S, Quick M, Nicola JP, Carrasco N, Amzel LM. (2015) Beyond non-integer Hill coefficients: A novel approach to analyzing binding data, applied to Na+-driven transporters. The Journal of General Physiology. 145: 555–63. PMID 26009546 DOI: 10.1085/jgp.201511365

Nicola JP, Carrasco N, Masini-Repiso AM. (2015) Dietary I(-) absorption: expression and regulation of the Na(+)/I(-) symporter in the intestine. Vitamins and Hormones. 98: 1-31. PMID 25817864 DOI: 10.1016/bs.vh.2014.12.002

Oikawa T, Wauthier E, Dinh TA, Selitsky SR, Reyna-Neyra A, Carpino G, Levine R, Cardinale V, Klimstra D, Gaudio E, Alvaro D, Carrasco N, Sethupathy P, Reid LM. (2015) Model of fibrolamellar hepatocellular carcinomas reveals striking enrichment in cancer stem cells. Nature Communications. 6: 8070. PMID 26437858 DOI: 10.1038/ncomms9070

Nicola JP, Reyna-Neyra A, Saenger P, Rodriguez-Buritica DF, Gamez Godoy JD, Muzumdar R, Amzel LM, Carrasco N. (2015) Sodium/Iodide Symporter Mutant V270E Causes Stunted Growth but No Cognitive Deficiency. The Journal of Clinical Endocrinology and Metabolism. 100: E1353-61. PMID 26204134 DOI: 10.1210/jc.2015-1824

Ravera S, Quick M, Nicola JP, Carrasco N, Amzel LM. (2015) Beyond non-integer Hill coefficients: A novel approach to analyzing binding data, applied to Na+-driven transporters. The Journal of General Physiology. 145: 555–63. PMID 26009546 DOI: 10.1085/jgp.201511365

Arriagada AA, Albornoz E, Opazo MC, Becerra A, Vidal G, Fardella C, Michea L, Carrasco N, Simon F, Elorza AA, Bueno SM, Kalergis AM, Riedel CA.(2015) Excess iodide induces an acute inhibition of the sodium/iodide symporter in thyroid male rat cells by increasing reactive oxygen species. Endocrinology. 156: 1540–51. PMID 25594695 DOI: 10.1210/en.2014-1371

References

20th-century births
Living people
Mexican physiologists
National Autonomous University of Mexico alumni
Albert Einstein College of Medicine faculty
Vanderbilt University faculty
Yale School of Medicine faculty
Members of the United States National Academy of Sciences
Scientists from Mexico City
20th-century American women scientists
21st-century American women scientists
Year of birth missing (living people)
American women academics
Members of the National Academy of Medicine